Reggiani is a surname. Notable people with the surname include:

Julia Reggiani, French former swimmer 
Loris Reggiani, Italian motorcycle racer
Patrizia Reggiani, Italian, ex-wife of Maurizio Gucci
Serge Reggiani, Italian-born French singer and actor
Thiago Cruz Reggiani, football former striker
Primo Reggiani, Italian actor